St. John's Parsonage is a historic house at 633 Pearl Street in Elizabeth, Union County, New Jersey, United States.

It served as the parsonage and school for St. John's Church from 1749 to about 1885, after which it was used by the parish for "charitable purposes" until 1902. It was thereafter sold and used as a boarding house until purchased by the Elizabethtown Historical Society in 1960 and renovated.

A stone plaque on the facade between the first and second stories states it was built 1696 and rebuilt 1817. The red brick Federal style structure dates to at least 1749, and was restored in 1960 to its 1818 appearance. One wing is believed to be date to a 1696 structure. The floor plan and silhouette are typical of New Jersey homes of the late 18th and early 19th centuries.

It was added to the National Register of Historic Places in 1982.

References

See also
Elizabeth River (New Jersey)
List of the oldest buildings in New Jersey
National Register of Historic Places listings in Union County, New Jersey

History of Elizabeth, New Jersey
Houses on the National Register of Historic Places in New Jersey
Federal architecture in New Jersey
Houses completed in 1696
Houses completed in 1818
Houses in Union County, New Jersey
National Register of Historic Places in Union County, New Jersey
Clergy houses in the United States
Buildings and structures in Elizabeth, New Jersey
New Jersey Register of Historic Places
1696 establishments in New Jersey